Yassine El Fathaoui (born 23 March 1982) is a Moroccan-born Italian long-distance runner, and was a part of the Italian athletics team for the Tokyo 2020 Olympics. He competed in the Marathon ending 47th.

References

External links
 

1982 births
Living people
Italian male long-distance runners
Italian people of Moroccan descent
Italian sportspeople of African descent
Sportspeople of Moroccan descent
Moroccan emigrants to Italy
Athletes (track and field) at the 2020 Summer Olympics
Olympic athletes of Italy